Yanino-1 is an urban locality (an urban-type settlement) in Vsevolozhsky District of Leningrad Oblast, Russia, located east of Saint Petersburg. Municipally it is, together with other localities, incorporated as Zanevskoye Urban Settlement, one of the eight urban settlements in the district. Population is over 5,000.

History
Until 2016, Yanino-1 was a village. In the 2010s, intensive high-rise residential construction started, and apartments were sold to individuals who had jobs in nearby Saint Petersburg. In 2015, there was a popular vote to upgrade the village to the urban-type settlement, and after the success of the vote, in February 2016 Yanino-1 was granted the urban-type settlement status. Simultaneously, Zanevskoye Rural Settlement changed its status and became Zanevskoye Urban Settlement.

Administrative and municipal status
Within the framework of administrative divisions, it is incorporated, together with the town of Kudrovo and a number of rural localities, within Vsevolozhsky District as Zanevskoye Settlement Municipal Formation. Yanino-1 is the administrative center of this municipal formation. As a municipal division, Zanevskoye Settlement Municipal Formation is incorporated within Vsevolozhsky Municipal District as Zanevskoye Urban Settlement.

Economy

Transportation
Ladozhskaya station, a metro station of the Saint Petersburg Metro, is located in a couple of kilometers west of Yanino-1. Buses connect the settlement with this station.

The railway line connecting the Ladozhsky railway station in Saint-Petersburg and Mga runs close to Yanino-1; 5 km platform is in a less than a kilometer from Yanino-1.

References

Notes

Sources

Urban-type settlements in Leningrad Oblast